Thomas Eston (fl. 1413), of Exeter, Devon, was an English politician.

He was a Member (MP) of the Parliament of England for Exeter in February 1413. Eston was Mayor of Exeter in 1414–15, 1419–20, 1422–3, and 1426–7.

References

14th-century births
15th-century deaths
English MPs February 1413
Members of the Parliament of England (pre-1707) for Exeter
Mayors of Exeter